RMS Britannia was an ocean liner of the British and North American Royal Mail Steam Packet Company, later known as Cunard Steamship Company.  She was launched on Wednesday 5 February 1840, at the yard of Robert Duncan & Company in Greenock, Scotland.  The ship and her sisters, Acadia, Caledonia, and Columbia, were the first ocean liners built by the company.

Description and service 
Britannia was a large ship for the period, 207 feet (63 m) long and 34 feet (10.3 m) across the beam, with three masts and a wooden hull. She had paddle wheels and her coal-powered two-cylinder side-lever engine (from Robert Napier) had a power output of about 740 indicated horsepower with a coal consumption around 38 tons per day. She had a tonnage, or carrying capacity, of 1,154 tons (by the Builder's Old Measurement). She was capable of carrying 115 passengers with a crew of 82.

On her maiden voyage, starting on 4 July 1840, she made Halifax, Nova Scotia, from Liverpool, England, in 12 days and 10 hours, continuing on to Boston, Massachusetts. The Britannia transported numerous types of cargo alongside its passengers. The cargo included  600 tons of coal; mail due across the Atlantic; livestock for food and milk; and cats to control the rat population. There were 115 passengers, with 82 crew members on board.

She was joined by her sister ship Acadia in August 1840, by Caledonia in October 1840 and by Columbia in January 1841, each constructed by a different shipbuilder. All four ships could carry 115 passengers and 225 tons of cargo. The dining saloon was a long deck-house placed on the upper deck and there was also a 'ladies only' saloon. The fare to Halifax was 35 guineas (2,964 GPB in 2015) which included wines and spirits as well as food.

In January 1842 Charles Dickens and his wife travelled to the United States on Britannia. The weather was bad, he was seasick for most of the voyage and returned home on a sailing ship.

As Barbarossa in German service 
In March 1849 she was sold by Cunard to the revolutionary German confederation  and was renamed SMS Barbarossa. She had nine guns fitted, and was the flagship of the Reichsflotte under Karl Rudolf Brommy in the Battle of Heligoland. In June 1852 she was transferred to the Prussian Navy and used as a barracks ship at Danzig.  In May 1880 she was decommissioned from the Prussian Navy and in July 1880 she was sunk as a target ship.

Film depiction of RMS Britannia
The funding and first crossing of Britannia were key plot elements in a Warner Brothers film released in 1941 as Atlantic Ferry in the U.K., and Sons of the Sea in the U.S.

References

External links 
 
 Britannia on thegreatoceanliners.com
 SMS Barbarossa http://www.janmaat.de/m_dfbarbarossa.htm 
 Britannia on Chris' Cunard Page https://www.chriscunard.com/history-fleet/cunard-fleet/1840-1900/britannia/

Ships of the Cunard Line
Victorian-era passenger ships of the United Kingdom
Victorian-era merchant ships of the United Kingdom
Steamships of the United Kingdom
Paddle steamers of the United Kingdom
Ships built on the River Clyde
1840 ships
Ships of the Prussian Navy
Maritime incidents in July 1880